The bridges and tunnels across the Yangtze River carry rail and road traffic across China's longest and largest river and form a vital part of the country's transportation infrastructure. The river bisects China proper from west to east, and every major north–south bound highway and railway must cross the Yangtze.  Large urban centers along the river such as Chongqing, Wuhan, and Nanjing also have urban mass transit rail lines crossing the Yangtze.

Since then, over 75 bridges and six tunnels have been built over this stretch, the overwhelming majority since 1990. They reflect a broad array of bridge designs and, in many cases, represent significant achievements in modern bridge engineering. Several rank among the world's longest suspension, cable-stayed, arch bridges, truss and box girder bridges as well as some of the highest and tallest bridges.

Upriver from Yibin, bridge spans are more common along the Jinsha and Tongtian sections where the Yangtze is much narrower, although numerous new bridges are being added.  The oldest bridge still in use is the Jinlong, a simple suspension bridge over the Jinsha section of the river in Lijiang, Yunnan that was originally built in 1880 and rebuilt in the 1936.

Section names of the Yangtze

Due to changes in the designation of the source of the Yangtze, various sections of the river have been thought of as distinct rivers with different names.  The bridges and tunnels of the Yangtze have compound names consisting of the location name and the river section name.  Today, the river has four sectional names in  : (1) Tuotuo, (2) Tongtian, (3) Jinsha and (4) Chang Jiang.
 The Tuotuo River, considered the official headstream of the Yangtze, flows  from the glaciers of the Gelaindong massif in the Tanggula Mountains of southwestern Qinghai to the confluence with the Dangqu River to form the Tongtian River.
 The Jinsha or Gold Sands River continues for  along the border of western Sichuan with Qinghai, Tibet, and Yunnan, through northern Yunnan and southern Sichuan to the confluence with the Min River at Yibin in south central Sichuan.
 Chang Jiang or the "Long River" refers to the final  of the Yangtze from Yibin through southeastern Sichuan, Chongqing, western Hubei, northern Hunan, eastern Hubei, northern Jiangxi, Anhui and Jiangsu to the river's mouth in Shanghai. Chang Jiang is generally substituted by "Yangtze" in English usage.

For example, the Nanjing Chang Jiang Bridge is translated as the Nanjing Yangtze River Bridge.  The Taku Jinsha River Bridge is a bridge along the Jinsha section of the Yangtze.

History

The Yangtze River forms a major geographic barrier dividing northern and southern China.  For millennia, travelers crossed the Yangtze by ferry.  In the first half of the 20th century, rail passengers from Beijing to Guangzhou and Shanghai had to disembark, respectively, at Hanyang and Pukou, and cross the river by steam ferry before resuming journeys by train.

Bridges in antiquity

Pontoon bridges

The earliest recorded pontoon bridge over the Yangtze was the Jiangguan Pontoon Bridge built in AD 35 by Gongsun Shu, the ruler of Sichuan, in the war with the Han Emperor Liu Xiu. Gongsun Shu built the pontoon across a narrow part of the river between Jingmen and Yichang in (modern Hubei Province) to block the Han Emperor's navy from sailing upriver into Sichuan.  The pontoon was burned in battle and Liu Xiu went on to capture Sichuan.

In 570, the Northern Zhou general Chen Teng built a crude suspension bridge across the Xiling Gorge using thick rope and reeds to carry food and provisions for his troops on the south bank.  The bridge was cut apart by boats lined with sharp knives sent down river by the Chen general Zhang Shaoda.

During the Tang Dynasty, a pontoon bridge was built in Sangouzhen in the Qutang Gorge in 619.

In 974, during the Song Emperor Zhao Kuangyin's conquest of the Southern Tang, a pontoon over 1,000 meters long linked together by bamboo chains was erected in just three days at Caishiji (Ma'anshan, Anhui Province) and enabled the Song Army to advance swiftly across the river and capture Nanjing, the Southern Tang capital.

The Taiping rebels made extensive use of pontoons on the Yangtze in their campaign against the Qing Dynasty in the Yangtze Basin.  On 30 December 1852, they built two pontoons nearly 3,000 meters long in a fortnight's time at Baishazhou and Yingwuzhou in Wuhan to move troops from Hanyang on the north bank to the Wuchang on the south bank.  The Taipings tied together small boats into twos and threes and steered these preassembled pieces simultaneously into the river, and used iron anchors to set the pontoons instead of chains.  They added leather-covered walls to the bridges and added towers and firing positions.

Pontoon bridges have not been a feasible long-term solution to cross river transport because they block boat traffic on the Yangtze, a major conduit for travelers and cargo between the coast and the Chinese interior.

Iron chain bridges

Dating back to 3rd century, militaries of antiquity have stretched iron chains across the Yangtze in the Three Gorges to block invading armies.  Notable examples include the iron chain defense of the Wu Kingdom in the Xiling Gorge against the Jin Dynasty in 280, the Former Shu's chain across Kuimen in the Qutang Gorge against the Jingnan in 925, and Song general Xu Zongwu's seven-link chain at the same location against the Mongols in 1264.

The first documented iron chain bridge across the river was built in the 7th century by the Tibetan Empire over the Jinsha.  The Shenchuan Iron Bridge, a simple suspension bridge, stood at what is today Tacun of Weixi Lisu Autonomous County in the Dêqên Tibetan Autonomous Prefecture of northwestern Yunnan Province, and was probably built to help the Tibetan military advance against the Kingdom of Nanzhao during its invasions between 682 and 704.  The Tibetans stationed a frontier command office in the town called the Shenchuan Iron Bridge jiedushi.  The bridge facilitated trade between the two countries until 794 when the Nanzhao realigned with the Tang Dynasty and destroyed the bridge in a war with the Tibetan Empire.

The oldest bridge still in use on the Yangtze is the Jinlong Bridge in Lijiang, a simple iron chain suspension bridge first built during the Qing Dynasty from 1876 to 1880.  It was destroyed in a flood in 1935 and rebuilt the following year.  The bridge was named a National Historical Site in 2006.

Iron chain bridges are more durable than pontoon bridges and allow for year-round use, although when the river level is high during the flood season, boards on the bridge deck must be removed.

Modern bridges

Chang Jiang

The first permanent bridge to cross the Chang Jiang section of the river was the Wuhan Yangtze River Bridge, built from 1955 to 1957.  The dual-use road-rail bridge was a major infrastructural project in the early years of the People's Republic and was completed with Soviet assistance.  The second bridge was a single-track railway bridge built in Chongqing in 1959.  The Nanjing Yangtze River Bridge, also a road-rail bridge, was the first bridge to cross the lower reaches of the Yangtze.  It was built from 1960 to 1968, after the Sino-Soviet split, and did not receive foreign assistance.  The Zhicheng Road-Rail Bridge followed in 1971.

Only two bridges opened in the 1980s, the Chongqing's First Shibanpo Bridge in 1980 and the Luzhou Road Bridge in 1982.  Both were in the upper reaches of Changjiang in Sichuan Province, to which Chongqing Municipality belonged at the time.

Bridge-building resumed in the 1990s and accelerated in the first decade of the 21st century due to the rapid growth of the Chinese economy.  Jiangxi Province had its first bridge in 1993 with the opening of the Jiujiang Bridge.  The first bridge in Anhui Province, the Tongling Bridge, opened in 1995.  Six of the 11 bridges built in the 1990s and half of the 40 bridge crossings added in the 2000s were built in Chongqing Municipality, which became a directly controlled municipality in 1997 to facilitate the construction of the Three Gorges and experienced a building boom.

By 2005, there were over 50 bridges across the Yangtze River between Yibin and Shanghai.  The rapid pace of bridge construction has continued.  The first tunnel under the Yangtze opened in Wuhan in 2008.

As of December 2014, urban Chongqing has 18 bridges, Wuhan has nine bridges and three tunnels, and Nanjing has five bridges and two tunnels.  About a dozen other bridges are now under construction.

In December 2020 a new bridge is planned to be opened, the Wufengshan Yangtze River Bridge with 4 + 4 highway lanes on the upper deck and 4 railway tracks in the lower deck.

Upstream sections

In the upper reaches of the Yangtze above Yibin, the Jinsha (Gold Sands), Tongtian, and Tuotuo sections of the river are narrower and bridges are more numerous.  As of December 2014, Yibin had 10 bridges across the Jinsha and Panzhihua had 16.

Bridge strain

With the advent of economic growth around the country and widespread use of heavy freight trucks, bridges along the Yangtze have been bearing greater load, leading to greater strain on older bridge structures. In November 2011, a crack was discovered in the bridge's steel structure and forced the authorities to close the bridge to freight traffic. Truck traffic had to be re-routed to neighboring provinces. In 2012, a crack was discovered in one girder of the Luzhou Yangtze River Bridge, leading to bridge closure and emergency repairs.

Longest and tallest bridges
Bridges over the Yangtze including some of the longest and tallest bridges in the world.
 The Runyang Bridge [2005], Fourth Nanjing Bridge [2012] and Jiangyin Bridge [1999] are all among the ten longest suspension bridges in the world.
 The Husutong Bridge [2020], Sutong Bridge [2008], Edong Bridge [2010], Jiujiang Expressway Bridge [2013] and Jingyue Bridge [2010] all have cable-stayed bridge spans that rank among the top ten in the world.
 The Chaotianmen Bridge [2009] is the longest arch bridge in the world. The Wushan Bridge [2005] also ranks in the top ten.
 The Dashengguan Bridge [2010] and Jiujiang Bridge [1992] rank among the longest continuous truss bridges by total truss length.
 The Sutong, Jingyue, Zhongzhou [2009], and Jiujiang Expressway Bridges rank among the ten tallest in the world.
It is the second longest suspension bridge in the world and the longest with a double-deck configuration.

Longest span timeline

List of existing bridges and tunnels

Chang Jiang

Jinsha

Tongtian

Tuotuo

Bridges and tunnels under construction

Chang Jiang

Upstream sections

Planned bridges

Abandoned

See also

 Yangtze River power line crossings
 List of bridges in China
 List of longest suspension bridge spans
 List of longest cable-stayed bridge spans
 List of longest arch bridge spans
 List of longest continuous truss bridge spans
 List of highest bridges in the world
 List of tallest bridges in the world

Notes

References

External links
 China Jiangsu Net Yangtze River Bridges

Yangtze
Articles containing video clips
Yangtze